Events of 2019 in Costa Rica.

Incumbents
President: Carlos Alvarado Quesada 
First Vice President: Epsy Campbell Barr 
Second Vice President: Marvin Rodríguez Cordero

Events

August

September

October

November

December

Births

Deaths

See also
 	

 		
 2019 Pan American Games

References 

 
Historical events in Costa Rica
Costa Rica